Events from the year 1523 in India.

Incumbents
 Governor of Portuguese India Duarte de Menezes

Events
 Santhome Church established in Chennai
 Portuguese settlement of São Tomé de Meliapore(presently Santhome) is established near Madras(Chennai), São Tomé de Meliapore

Births

Deaths
 Chandan of Kamata,  first king of the Kamata-Koch kingdom dies (born 1483)

References

See also

 Timeline of Indian history